We're Dancin was an American music television program that aired on MTV for one season, from 1982–1983. It featured performances by various new wave music acts. Townsend Coleman was the show's host.

List of new wave music acts that appeared on We're Dancin
 Bow Wow Wow
 The Waitresses
 Wang Chung
 Culture Club
 Marshall Crenshaw
 Billy Idol

1982 American television series debuts
1983 American television series endings
1980s American music television series
MTV original programming